Praunsperger is a surname. Notable people with the surname include:

Lenart Praunsperger, 16th-century Slovenian politician
Wilhelm Praunsperger (1497–1589), Slovenian politician